CastleCourt is a shopping centre on Royal Avenue in Belfast, Northern Ireland. It is Northern Ireland's third largest shopping centre after Victoria Square and Foyleside in Derry. As at 2007 it had approximately 16 million visits a year., and sale densities ranked in the top 10% in the UK.

History

The centre was built by John Laing on the site of the former Grand Central Hotel.  The nature of the development made it a target for the Provisional IRA: the centre was bombed five times during its construction, four times after it opened, and suffered incendiary bomb attacks. It is now the third largest shopping complex in Northern Ireland after the construction of the new Victoria Square shopping centre; which is also located in Belfast and Foyleside, Derry.

References

External links
 castlecourt-uk.com — official website

Shopping centres in Northern Ireland
Buildings and structures in Belfast
Tourist attractions in Belfast
Westfield Group